Gethsemane Episcopal Church is a historic Episcopal church building in Appleton, Minnesota, United States.  It was built in 1879 during the episcopate of pioneer Bishop Henry Benjamin Whipple.  It was originally a wooden-frame structure with the board and batten walls and lancet windows typical of Carpenter Gothic style. Around 1920 the interior and exterior walls were plastered over, which greatly changed its appearance and obscured its Carpenter Gothic origin. Over the years additions were made to the building and a basement was added.

The church was listed on the National Register of Historic Places in 2011 for having local significance in the theme of religion.  It was nominated for representing the westernmost expansion of the Episcopal church in southern Minnesota under Bishop Whipple.

Gethsemane Episcopal Church ceased to be an active parish in 1991, but it is still owned by the Episcopal Diocese of Minnesota and is occasionally used for funerals and other services.

See also
 List of Anglican churches
 National Register of Historic Places listings in Swift County, Minnesota

References

19th-century Episcopal church buildings
1879 establishments in Minnesota
Carpenter Gothic church buildings in Minnesota
Churches completed in 1879
Churches in Swift County, Minnesota
Churches on the National Register of Historic Places in Minnesota
Episcopal church buildings in Minnesota
National Register of Historic Places in Swift County, Minnesota